Masahiro Yamada may refer to:

, Japanese screenwriter
, Japanese sociologist